Risberget may refer to the following places:

Risberget, Grue, a village in Grue municipality in Innlandet county, Norway
Risberget, Våler, a village the Våler municipality in Innlandet county, Norway
Risberget Chapel, a chapel in Våler municipality in Innlandet county, Norway